Bastian Müller (born 31 July 1991) is a German footballer who plays as a midfielder for Wuppertaler SV.

Career

Müller played as a youth for a number of Westphalian clubs, including Arminia Bielefeld, SC Paderborn and SC Verl, and it was at Verl that he made his breakthrough in senior football, being promoted to the first-team squad for the beginning of the 2010–11 season. He made 15 appearances in the Regionalliga West during the first half of the season, which attracted the attention of Bayern Munich, whom he joined in January 2011. He went straight into Bayern's reserve team, intended to replace David Alaba, who had joined 1899 Hoffenheim on loan, and made his 3. Liga debut on 22 January 2011, replacing fellow debutant Antonio Pangallo in a 2–0 defeat against Wacker Burghausen. Despite being named on Bayern's 'B' list for the 2011–12 UEFA Champions League, he was released by the club in summer 2012. On 1 July 2012, Fortuna Düsseldorf announced that Müller had signed for the club on a two-year contract. After two years with Düsseldorf without making a first-team appearance, Müller signed for Alemannia Aachen of the Regionalliga West.

References

External links
 
 

1991 births
Living people
German footballers
SC Verl players
FC Bayern Munich II players
Fortuna Düsseldorf players
Alemannia Aachen players
SV Waldhof Mannheim players
Rot-Weiß Oberhausen players
Wuppertaler SV players
3. Liga players
Regionalliga players
Association football midfielders